Amin Khan is a Bangladeshi actor. Khan has appeared in about 200 films as well as television shows.

Khan studied in Ideal College, Dhaka.

In 1990, he came in the media through the competition named Notun Mukher Shondhane. He started acting in a  1993 movie titled Obuj Duti Mon, which was directed by Mohammad Hossain. One of the films that brought him to attention was Soitan Manush directed by Montazur Rahman Akbar. He was acted akbar blockbuster film Coolie.

Early life
Khan was born and grew up in greater Khulna.

Filmography

Music Videor

TV drama
 Kokhono Megh Kokhono Rodru
 Monpura
 Nirbasito Valobasha
 Brishti Thamar Por
 Valobashi
 Fine Jamai
 Sei Tumi Alea
 Shudhu Tumi (1997)

Telefilm

See also
 Cinema of Bangladesh

References

External links
 
 Amin Khan Biography

Living people
Bangladeshi male film actors
People from Khulna
1977 births
People from Khulna District
21st-century Bangladeshi male actors